The Helderberg Sun is a local newspaper in the Helderberg region of Cape Town, Western Cape, South Africa. This includes the Strand and Somerset West.

Weekly newspapers published in South Africa
Mass media in Cape Town
Publications with year of establishment missing